In the religion of ancient Rome, a haruspex (plural haruspices; also called aruspex) was a person trained to practise a form of divination called haruspicy (haruspicina), the inspection of the entrails (exta—hence also extispicy (extispicium)) of sacrificed animals, especially the livers of sacrificed sheep and poultry. 
The reading of omens specifically from the liver is also known by the Greek term  hepatoscopy (also hepatomancy).

The Roman concept is directly derived from Etruscan religion, as one of the three branches of the disciplina Etrusca. Such methods continued to be used well into the Middle Ages, especially among Christian apostates and pagans.

The Latin terms haruspex and haruspicina are from an archaic word, hīra = "entrails, intestines" (cognate with hernia = "protruding viscera" and hira = "empty gut"; PIE *ǵʰer-) and from the root  spec- = "to watch, observe". The Greek ἡπατοσκοπία hēpatoskōpia is from hēpar = "liver" and skop- = "to examine".

Ancient Near East

The Babylonians were famous for hepatoscopy. This practice is mentioned in the Book of Ezekiel 21:21:

One Babylonian clay model of a sheep's liver, dated between 1900 and 1600 BC, is conserved in the British Museum. 

The Assyro-Babylonian tradition was also adopted in Hittite religion. At least thirty-six liver-models have been excavated at Hattusa. Of these, the majority are inscribed in Akkadian,  but a few examples also have inscriptions in the native Hittite language, indicating the adoption of haruspicy as part of the native, vernacular cult.

Haruspicy in Ancient Italy
Roman haruspicy was a form of communication with the gods. Rather than strictly predicting future events, this form of Roman divination allowed humans to discern the attitudes of the gods and react in a way that would maintain harmony between the human and divine worlds (pax deorum). Before taking important actions, especially in battle, Romans conducted animal sacrifices to discover the will of the gods according to the information gathered through reading the animals' entrails. The entrails (most importantly the liver, but also the lungs and heart) contained a large number of signs that indicated the gods' approval or disapproval. These signs could be interpreted according to the appearance of the organs, for example, if the liver was "smooth, shiny and full" or "rough and shrunken". The Etruscans looked for the caput iocineris, or "head of the liver". It was considered a bad omen if this part was missing from the animal's liver. The haruspex would then study the flat visceral side of the liver after examining the caput iocineris.

Haruspicy in Ancient Italy originated with the Etruscans. Textual evidence for Etruscan divination comes from an Etruscan inscription: the priest Laris Pulenas' (250–200 BCE) epitaph mentions a book he wrote on haruspicy. A collection of sacred texts called the Etrusca disciplina, written in Etruscan, were essentially guides on different forms of divination, including haruspicy and augury. In addition, a number of archeological artifacts depict Etruscan haruspicy. These include a bronze mirror with an image of a haruspex dressed in Etruscan priest's clothing, holding a liver while a crowd gathers near him. Another significant artifact relating to haruspicy in Ancient Italy is the Piacenza Liver. This bronze model of a sheep's liver was found by chance by a farmer in 1877. Names of gods are etched into the surface and organized into different sections. Artifacts depicting haruspicy exist from the ancient Roman world as well, such as stone relief carvings located in Trajan's Forum.

See also
 Anthropomancy
 Augur
 Auspice

References

Bibliography

 Walter Burkert, 1992. The Orientalizing Revolution: Near Eastern Influence on Greek Culture in the Early Archaic Age (Thames and Hudson), pp 46–51.
 Derek Collins, "Mapping the Entrails: The Practice of Greek Hepatoscopy" American Journal of Philology 129 [2008]: 319-345
 Marie-Laurence Haack, Les haruspices dans le monde romain (Bordeaux : Ausonius, 2003).
Hans Gustav Güterbock, 'Hittite liver models' in:  Language, Literature and History (FS Reiner) (1987), 147–153, reprinted in   Hoffner (ed.) Selected Writings'', Assyriological Studies no. 26 (1997).

External links
  This source suggests that Greek and Roman haruspices used the entrails of human corpses; the victim should be "without spot or blemish".
 Haruspices, article in Smith's Dictionary of Greek and Roman Antiquities
 Figurine of Haruspex, 4th Cent. B.C. Vatican Museums Online, Gregorian Etruscan Museum, Room III

Ancient Roman augury
Divination
Etruscan religion
Middle Eastern mythology
Ancient Roman occupations